John Bowyer (18 June 1790 – 3 February 1880) was an English professional cricketer.

He was mainly associated with Surrey and he made 18 known appearances in first-class matches from 1810 to 1828.

References

1790 births
1880 deaths
English cricketers
English cricketers of 1787 to 1825
English cricketers of 1826 to 1863
Surrey cricketers
Players cricketers
Left-Handed v Right-Handed cricketers
Epsom cricketers
Non-international England cricketers
The Bs cricketers